Saint Gregory the Great Parish Church may refer to:

Saint Gregory the Great Parish Church in Indang, Cavite, Philippines.
Saint Gregory the Great Parish Church in Majayjay, Laguna, Philippines.
Saint Gregory the Great Parish Church in Manhattan, New York, United States.
Saint Gregory the Great Church in Danbury, Connecticut. 
Saint Gregory the Great Church in Cheltenham, Gloucestershire, England.

See also 
St Gregory's Church (disambiguation)
Saint Gregory the Great